The women's changquan competition at the 2014 Asian Games in Incheon, South Korea was held on 23 September at the Ganghwa Dolmens Gymnasium.

Schedule
All times are Korea Standard Time (UTC+09:00)

Results

References

External links
Official website

Women's changquan